The Horn government was the third government in Hungary after the change of regime, which was formed from a coalition of two parties, the MSZP and the SZDSZ. The coalition had a two-thirds majority in Parliament, but voluntarily agreed to amend the two-thirds laws only if there was a consensus with the opposition. The government took the oath of office on July 15, 1994.  After their defeat of the 1998 elections, Prime Minister Gyula Horn's term expired on 6 July 1998, and the other cabinet members' 8 July 1998.

Party breakdown

Beginning of term
Party breakdown of cabinet ministers in the beginning of term:

End of term
Party breakdown of cabinet ministers in the end of term:

Composition

References 
Mária Baranyi: Egy előszoba titkai – Horn Gyula közelről 1994–1998 (Athenaeum 2000, published in 2010) ISBN 9789632930466

József Bölöny: Magyarország kormányai 1848–2004 (Governments of Hungary from 1848 to 2004) Az 1987–2004 közötti időszakot feldolgozta és sajtó alá rendezte Hubai László. 5. bővített és javított kiadás. (the period between 1987 and 2004 was written by László Hubai) Budapest, Akadémiai Kiadó. 2004. ISBN 963-05-8106-X

Hungarian governments
1994 establishments in Hungary
1998 disestablishments in Hungary
Cabinets established in 1994
Cabinets disestablished in 1998